Do It Yourself may refer to:
 Do it yourself (DIY), a term used by various communities that focus on people creating things for themselves without the aid of paid professionals
 Do-it-yourself biology
 Do-it-yourself investing
 DIY Network, a television channel that focuses on do it yourself projects at home
 DIY ethic
 Do It Yourself (Ian Dury & the Blockheads album), a 1979 album
 Do It Yourself (The Seahorses album), a 1997 album
 "Do It Yourself" (song), 2007 single by Uniting Nations
 "Do It Yourself" CBC TV Series (1982-1985)